Salahlı is a village and municipality in the Samukh District of Azerbaijan.  It has a population of 670.

References 

Populated places in Samukh District